Kaitlyn Robrock (born December 30, 1983) is an American voice actress best known as the current voice of Minnie Mouse for Disney, Felicia Sundew in Amphibia, Tommy on the television series Mr. Pickles and Momma Named Me Sheriff on Adult Swim and Retsuko's mother in the English dub of Netflix anime series Aggretsuko.

Beginning in 2020, Robrock took over as the voice of Minnie Mouse for Disney after Minnie's long-time voice actress Russi Taylor's death a year earlier.

Early life 
Kaitlyn Robrock was born on December 30, 1983, in San Diego, California. Robrock also worked in the Disneyland Resort in Anaheim, California as an Entertainment Host.

Career
Robrock's other notable roles include Mrs. Budnick on Golan the Insatiable, Roxie Guttman on Netflix’s Dead End: Paranormal Park, and several characters on Cartoon Network's ThunderCats Roar. She has worked for Walt Disney Parks and Resorts, Disney Television Animation, Warner Bros. Animation and Marvel Entertainment. She also assumed the role of Minnie Mouse after Russi Taylor died in July 2019.

Filmography

Film

Animation

Video games

References

External links
 
 
 

1983 births
Living people
Actresses from San Diego
American video game actresses
American voice actresses
Disney people
Walt Disney Parks and Resorts people
21st-century American actresses